Shawn Huang Wei Zhong  (né Ingkiriwang; ; born 1982) is a Singaporean politician. A member of the governing People's Action Party (PAP), he has been the Member of Parliament (MP) representing the Jurong Spring division of Jurong GRC since 2020. 

Before entering politics, he is an F-16 fighter pilot in the Republic of Singapore Air Force (RSAF) between 2000 and 2018. He has also been a director at Tasek Jurong, a charity organisation, since 2014.

Early life and education 
Huang's birth name was Ingkiriwang Shawn Wei Zhong. His great-grandfather, an Indonesian Chinese, had changed his original Chinese surname  "Huang" to the Indonesian-sounding "Ingkiriwang". In 1989, Huang had a deed poll to change his Indonesian Chinese surname to the original "Huang". However, due to administrative confusion, Huang was still known as "Ingkiriwang" until as late as 2018 when he was the parade commander for Singapore's 53rd National Day Parade.

Huang graduated with a Bachelor of Science in aeronautical engineering from the United States Air Force Academy in 2006. In 2015, he was awarded the Lee Kuan Yew Scholarship to pursue the Tsinghua-MIT Global Master of Business Administration at Tsinghua University.

Career

Military career 
Huang joined the Republic of Singapore Air Force as a pilot trainee in 2001 and has over 1,000 flying hours on the CT4B, S211, A-4 Super Skyhawk and F-16 Fighting Falcon. He held several staff and operational appointments and was the Commanding Officer of the 140 Squadron. He continues to serve his National Service as a F-16 fighter pilot.

On 14 September 2017, Huang was the parade commander for President Halimah Yacob's inauguration ceremony held at the Istana.

On 9 August 2018, Huang was the parade commander for Singapore's 53rd National Day Parade, in conjunction with the Republic of Singapore Air Force's 50th anniversary.

Political career 
Huang was fielded for the 2020 general election as one of five candidates representing the People's Action Party (PAP) in Jurong GRC. On 11 July 2020, Huang was declared an elected Member of the 14th Parliament.

Awards 
In 2019, Huang was awarded the Public Service Medal.

Personal life 
Huang has a daughter named Geraldine.

References

External links
 Shawn Huang Wei Zhong on Parliament of Singapore

Living people
1982 births
United States Air Force Academy alumni
People's Action Party politicians
Members of the Parliament of Singapore
Republic of Singapore Air Force personnel